Bulbostylis eleocharoides is a species of plant in the family Cyperaceae first described by Robert Kral and Mark T. Strong. Its native range is Bolivia to Paraguay. No subspecies are listed in the Catalogue of Life.

References

eleocharoides
Flora of Bolivia
Flora of Paraguay